The characters from the Pakistan sitcom television series Bulbulay based on their respective counterparts.

Main characters

Recurring characters
Although there are a lot of minor and recurring characters, the most notable include:
 Tariq Butt as Butt Sahb, First seen in the first episode sharing a bench with Khubsoorat at the train station where he is reading an English newspaper, the narrator says that he enjoys reading English newspapers and comes to the station often to read the newspaper for free. The narrator then says, he stares at every woman as if she were his wife, following this comments he starts staring at Khubsoorat and starts flirting with her, as a result she gets up and walks out of the station. Later it turns out he is a police officer and occurs regularly in the series. He is a good friend of the family. He does not know how to do his duty, when he is called to help he usually does nothing useful and mostly ends up worsening the situation.
 Khawaja Akmal as Siddiqui, Nabeel's father in-law and Khubsoorat's father. He does not like Nabeel due to his incompetence and laziness and despises Nabeel for marrying his daughter. When Khubsoorat first meets her dad after running away from the marriage, she tells him she married Nabeel so that he does not take her back home with him. Later he finds out she is not married and says he is coming to take her back home, but unfortunately for Siddiqui, by the time he arrives, Khubsoorat is already married to Nabeel. When Nabeel's friend Ahmar finds tenants for his apartment, and the family has to evacuate the apartment, it is Siddiqui who arranges and pays for the new home for his daughter and as a result for the family to live in. He married another girl in episode 140.
 Binita David as Baytab, Siddiqui married her in episode 140. Although she is married to the much older Siddiqui, she often talks to her ex-boyfriend Omer on phone. Siddiqui is however, aware of this. It seems as if she has only married Siddiqui for money. She calls Siddiqui "Babloo".`
 Shahid Khawaja as Dr. Shahid 612, Bulbulay's family doctor. He was a mental patient before and after treatment he became an animal's doctor. He often mentions that he's still ill and his mental illness can't be cured and previously had many diseases like T.B, cancer, Hepatitis etc.
Ayaz Khan as Sher Khan 
He is a friend of Mehmood Sahab. He is quite hard, greedy and normal hearted person.
Faizan shahzad khan as Faizi sun played many random characters and many guest appearances.

Special appearances 
 Reema Khan on eid special
 Aijaz Aslam as Nabeel's deceased father: Although he had died fifteen years ago, his ghost has appeared in three episodes of Bulbulay when he wanted to kill Mehmood Sahab because he is Momo's second husband. However, when Nabeel told him that he loves Mehmood Sahab more than him, his ghost left.
 Irfan Motiwala as a thief (chor) in Ramadan Episode 160 and another Episode they are kidnaper of Mehmood.
 Ashraf Khan as Father of Momo who came in many episodes of Bulbulay. He also came as a magician in an episode.
 Nayyar Ejaz as Nayyar Bhai the brother-in-law of Mehmood Aslam who has appeared twice.
 Zuhab Khan as Zeeshan a child who got lost in a market and Momo took him with her.
 Maqsood Hassan as ghost

See also
 Bulbulay
 List of Pakistani actresses
 List of Pakistani actors
 List of Pakistani television serials

References

External links 
 

Lists of Pakistani television series characters